Mrchojedy is a village within the municipality and cadastral municipality of Samopše in the Kutná Hora District of the Czech Republic.

History 
The earliest written record of Mrchojedy is in 1316. The village was owned by Sázava Monastery. It was acquired by the Waldstein family in the 16th century, but in the 17th century, it has returned to the ownership of the Sázava Monastery. The monastery was closed down by decree of Emperor Joseph II in 1785.

In popular culture
A 15th century recreation of the village, called Merhojed, is featured in the video game Kingdom Come: Deliverance.

References

This article was initially translated from the Czech Wikipedia.

Villages in Kutná Hora District